"Making Love Out of Nothing at All" is a power ballad written and composed by Jim Steinman and first released by the British/Australian soft rock duo Air Supply for their 1983 compilation album Greatest Hits. It reached number 2 on the U.S. Billboard Hot 100 for three weeks (behind "Total Eclipse of the Heart" by Bonnie Tyler, giving Steinman a consecutive peak of two songs). The song has been covered by other artists.

Background and recording 
The song is a reworking of the main title theme from the 1980 film A Small Circle of Friends, for which Jim Steinman wrote the score. It was first recorded by Air Supply, giving them a number two hit on the Billboard Hot 100 in the U.S. for three weeks. It was held off from the top spot by another Steinman production, Bonnie Tyler's recording of "Total Eclipse of the Heart". This is the group's last top ten hit in the United States.

The song was subsequently released as a new track from their 1983 greatest hits album. The B-side of the single is "Late Again". They have included the song on their numerous greatest hits and live albums, and recorded an acoustic version for their 2005 album The Singer and the Song.

Steinman offered the song, along with "Total Eclipse of the Heart", to Meat Loaf for his Midnight at the Lost and Found album; however, Meat Loaf's record company refused to pay Steinman for the material so Meat Loaf ended up writing compositions for the album himself. Steinman's songs were then offered to Bonnie Tyler and Air Supply. However, in an interview with journalist Mick Wall shortly after the release of Meat Loaf's 2006 album Bat Out of Hell III: The Monster Is Loose, Steinman stated: "I didn't write [Total Eclipse of the Heart] for anyone but Bonnie." Steinman believed that CBS were expecting him to write something similar to "It's a Heartache", but he had different ideas.

By 1983, Air Supply had changed much of its classic musician line-up, both in the recording studio and on tour. But Steinman, known for his lavish, rock-opera-ish type productions, used Bruce Springsteen's E-Street Band members Roy Bittan on keyboards and Max Weinberg on drums, to musically underscore the recording with like energies. Rick Derringer, who was previously the guitarist for the McCoys and Johnny Winter, provided the electric guitar solo that made the sound of "Making Love Out of Nothing at All" stand so drastically apart from most other Air Supply songs. In an interview, Hitchcock and Russell confirmed Hitchcock did his vocals in one take. When Steinman asked "What do we do next?" Russell replied "We go home".

Music video 
Two versions of the music video were produced. The initial version begins with a couple driving to an airport; the man (Graham Russell) is "leaving for a tour" and asks the woman (played by Graham Russell's real-life spouse, Jodi Russell) to join him:

The plane seen in the video is a Learjet 35. The remainder of the video intersperses Air Supply onstage with various scenes of the man and woman's relationship. Hitchcock and Russell leave their dressing room for the stage; as they sing with the band, the woman (Jodi Russell) is shown packing to leave. Nevertheless, she changes her mind and does a u-turn on the freeway, and now drives to the airport. She meets Russell at the side of the stage near the end of the song and they embrace. 

The subsequent official version is set in 1960s New York City and involves a Marine and a young woman and the various challenges they encounter in their relationship, interspersed with scenes of the band singing the song.

Chart history

Weekly charts

Year-end charts

Personnel 
 Russell Hitchcock - lead vocals
 Graham Russell - backing vocals
 Rick Derringer - electric guitar
 Sid McGinnis - acoustic guitar
 Steve Buslowe - bass
 Roy Bittan - synthesizers and piano
 Eric Troyer, Rory Dodd, Holly Sherwood - backing vocals
 Max Weinberg - drums

+ In initial releases of Air Supply's 1983 Greatest Hits album, Steve Buslowe was not included as the bassist in the album credits. However, this error was corrected in future pressings.

Bonnie Tyler version

The song was later covered by Welsh singer Bonnie Tyler on her album Free Spirit. It opens with a wordless choral vocal followed by sounds of thunderclaps and a bell before the melody begins, played on piano. Over the piano section is an excerpt from "Un bel dì vedremo", the aria from Puccini's Madama Butterfly, sung by Tyler's mother Elsie Hopkins.

AllMusic called this version "fantastic, clocking in at nearly eight minutes, and seems perfectly suited for her voice. [Air Supply's] version was already great, but hers is awesome." It was produced by Steinman, with Steven Rinkoff as co-producer, at The Hit Factory, New York City.

Lyrics 
These lines were changed for the Tyler version, and also for the subsequent Karine Hannah version, as well:

Charts

Rory Dodd demo version
A version from 1982 sung by Rory Dodd also exists.  The only accompaniment is Steinman playing piano, and he includes several variations on the primary melody in the intro and bridge.

Lyrics 
After the bridge, there are two verses that appear before the final two verses of the Air Supply version.  The verse from the Tyler version is not included.

In other media

Air Supply's version of the song is also featured in the 2005 film Mr. and Mrs. Smith during the car chase-gunfight scene, and is also featured on the film's soundtrack album. It was also used in the films Click and Dumb and Dumberer: When Harry Met Lloyd. It was also used in the TV series "Claws" in the ending scene of episode 3 in season 2.

In 1983, Air Supply performed the song on stage, in "lip-sync" form with full back-up band for the popular early 1980s television program Solid Gold. Absent were many of the musicians that producer Jim Steinman used to record the original tracks.  However, original Air Supply members Frank Esler-Smith on keys and Ralph Cooper on drums participated, and former Babys lead guitarist Wally Stocker "synced" so well, studio player Rick Derringer's guitar solo, without the slightest of glitch.

Singer-songwriter Rhett Miller referenced the song in the lyrics of "Hover" from his 2003 album The Instigator: "Wrapped up in each other / Making loving out of nothing like the air supplier said."

The song was used for a Wendy's commercial, where a "burger" is "singing" a part of the song, part of a promo being used in conjunction with online music service Rhapsody. The song was also used in the episode "Chuck Versus the Predator" of the American TV series Chuck.

A cover of the song by Mari Nallos is the theme song of the Tagalized (means "translated" in Tagalog) version of My Husband's Woman, a South Korean series which is aired in the Philippines on GMA 7.

In 2012, this song, along with "Total Eclipse of the Heart", was a central plot point in "Unknown Subject", the twelfth episode of season seven of US TV series Criminal Minds. In the show, a bar piano player attempts to convince a victim that he isn't the one who attacked her. He claims she thought she heard him play "Total Eclipse of the Heart" (which the attacker had played during her attack), when he had actually played "Making Love Out of Nothing at All", and says they sound similar because they were composed by the same person.

The song is the theme song of the film Monga, covered by Nicky Lee.

The song was background music for much of the 2016–17 season finale of the ABC show The Goldbergs.

The song was included in Bat Out of Hell: The Musical, created by Steinman.

The song was also used during the final act of The Strangers: Prey at Night, where the character Kinsey is chased by the Man in the Mask who is driving a fire-covered car.

In 2019, Bang Chan, the leader of the Australian-Korean K-pop boy group Stray Kids under JYP Entertainment, mentioned this song during a live broadcast on the website 'V LIVE', which was titled '찬이의 "방"'. Bang Chan named this song as one of his song recommendations.

In 2019, during Episode 6 of Netflix's Daybreak, a character performs the song in a performance where his life is at stake.

References

1983 songs
1983 singles
1995 singles
1980s ballads
Air Supply songs
Bonnie Tyler songs
Rock ballads
Songs written by Jim Steinman
Song recordings produced by Jim Steinman
Arista Records singles
Geffen Records singles
East West Records singles
Song recordings with Wall of Sound arrangements